Teófilo Torres (born 6 March 1954 in Ponce, Puerto Rico) is a Puerto Rican actor, director and professor of theatre. He has acted for both television as well the big screen, and has performed in Puerto Rico and internationally.

Early years 

Teófilo Torres was born in Ponce, Puerto Rico, on 6 March 1954. He started into his acting career while he was still in high school in the town of Jayuya, Puerto Rico.

Early career
In the early 1980s he participated in "A mis amigos de la locura", and "Papo Impala esta quita'o". In the mid-1980s, Torres partook in the Puerto Rican telenovela "Tiempo de vivir" starring Fernando Allende and Ivonne Goderich. In the late 1980s he had a role in the movie Glitz, produced by NBC and starring Jimmy Smits, and filmed in Puerto Rico. In this movie Torres played the role of a member of the police force fighting crime. Torres also particIpated in the telenovelas "Ave de paso", where he played the role of "Cheíto", an frustrated artist suffering from alcoholism, and in "Yara Prohibida" broadcast via Puerto Rico's Channel 11.  Also during this time, Torres opened his own school of dramatic arts teaching courses in acting, dance and speech. Subsequently, Torres played roles in various other works such as "Contradanza", as Queen Isabel, and boasted 17 monólogs, including "El caso Dios", "La apología de Sócrates", "Papo Impala está quitao" and "A mis amigos de la locura". In 1993, Torres delved into the big screen in "La Guagua Aérea", directed by Luis Milona with a fairly good reception, both in Puerto Rico and internationally. He also worked on the monólogs "Pedro, el rojo", "Pepé Loló", "Maco" and later "El Maestro", where he plays the role of Don Pedro Albizu Campos, one of the most prominent Puerto Rican politicians of all times, and a leader in the Puerto Rican independence movement.

Education
In 1994 Torres moved to New York City where he earned a MFA at Brooklyn College.

Teaching, drama, and acting
In 1999, Torres returned to Puerto Rico where he worked on the telenovela "Cuando despierta el amor", presented via Puerto Rico's public television WIPR-TV. Later he appeared in the Puerto Rican Telemundo TV series titled "Después del adiós" where he played "Arturo Bolívar", a man ill with the Lou Gehrig's disease, and participated in the movie "Los Díaz de Doris" directed by Abdiel Colberg. In the same year he participated in the movie for television "Punto final", by Edwin Reyes. In that production, transmitted by Univision Puerto Rico Channel 11, Torres played the role of "Juaco", a nuyorican poet seeking to recover his identity. Torres also returns to teaching at the Drama Department of the University of Puerto Rico, in Río Piedras. In the early 2000s he plays the role of Antonio, a homosexual priest, in the movie 12 Horas by director Raúl Marchand. Torres's acting in 12 Horas was highly spoken of by the critics, marking one of his most prominent roles in the big screen.  Since then, Torres has played the lead acting roles in the two most recent films by Jacobo Morales: "Dios los cría ll" and "Ángel", as well as in "Ruido", by director César Rodríguez and winner of the "Innovacion" award at the 2006 International Cinema Festival in Montreal, "Chiringa", "Desamores", "El sueño del regreso", and "Che" starring Benicio del Toro and directed by Steven Soderbergh and the 2010 "María", directed by Fernando Allende. He also developed the theatrical shows "Monogamia", "Bent", "Jav y Joss" (co-starring Francisco Capó) "Un enemigo del Pueblo", and "El caso Dios", among others.

Filmography

Theatre

Director and producer 

 2008 Todo es según el color
 2007 Oh María
 2005 El huésped vacio
 2004 Voces
 2004 Vegigantes
 2003 La mirada del hombre oscuro
 1998 El duende oculto
 1997 Snekin’outa revolvin door
 1995 Pedro el rojo
 1995 Maco
 1995 Pepe Dolores
 1990 Hombre
 1990 El Gfbar
 1989 Papo Impala va palante
 1988 Terrazo
 1988 La perra de Darwin
 1986 EL doctor Moncho Loro
 1985 La apología de Sócrates
 1984 El caso Dios
 1984 Colectilogo
 1983 Walenda
 1983 En defensa de Natalie
 1983 Papo Impala esta quitao
 1982 A mis amigos de la locura
 1982 Había una vez y dos son tres

References

External links 
 Teófilo Torres, Fundación Nacional para la Cultura Popular

Male actors from Ponce, Puerto Rico
1954 births
Living people
Puerto Rican male film actors
Puerto Rican male stage actors
Puerto Rican male television actors
Brooklyn College alumni